The National Debate Tournament is an American inter-college debate competition, held annually since 1947. The Rex Copeland award, inaugurated in 1989 for the team with the best performance over the whole season, is presented on the same occasion.

National Debate Tournament champions
Wake Forest University maintains a list of champions, runners-up, and semi-finalists.

Tournament victories by school

Rex Copeland Award
 
The Rex Copeland award, presented on the eve of the NDT, goes to the team with the best season-long performance, ranked #1 among the 16 teams with automatic bids to the tournament.   Rex Copeland, a debater at Samford University, was murdered by his debate coach, William Slagle, in 1989.

Wake Forest University maintains a list of the top 5 finishers for the Copeland Award.

References

North American debating competitions